Ptilininae is a subfamily of death-watch beetles in the family Ptinidae. 

The subfamily Ptilininae, along with Anobiinae and several others, were formerly considered members of the family Anobiidae, but the family name has since been changed to Ptinidae.

Genera
Fallanobium
Nepalanobium
Phanerochila
Plumilus
Ptilinus
Yunnanobium

References

Further reading

External links

 

Ptinidae